Isla Ixtapa is a small island near Zihuatanejo (Ixtapa) in the Mexican state of Guerrero. 

Islands of Guerrero